Altha subnotata is a moth of the family Limacodidae first described by Francis Walker in 1865. It is found in Sri Lanka, India and Nepal.

Palpi short. Mid and hind tibia lack spurs. Head, thorax and abdomen pure white. Wings broad and rounded. Forewings bright white with a black dot beyond the lower end of the cell. Two dots are found on the outer margin below the apex. Underside of forewing costa blackish. Hindwings whitish with two black dots on outer margin below apex.

The caterpillar is sluggish and is found on the underside of leaves. Its body is a perfectly semi-ovoid. Early instars are greyish white and translucent. A transverse olive-brown band is present anteriorly, centrally and posteriorly. A double dorsal series of six transparent glossy humps are visible with a lens when the caterpillar reaches later instars. Late instars are pale bluish green with a narrow white dorsal band. On the flank, there are several wavy dorsal lines. A yellow sub-lateral stripe is present. Pupation occurs in a white ovoid cocoon, which is dull, hard and smooth.

References

Moths of Asia
Moths described in 1865
Limacodidae